meta-Tyramine, also known as m-tyramine and 3-tyramine, is an endogenous trace amine neuromodulator and a structural analog of phenethylamine. It is a positional isomer of para-tyramine, and similarly to it, has effects on the adrenergic and dopaminergic systems.

meta-Tyramine is produced in humans via aromatic amino acid decarboxylase-mediated metabolism of meta-tyrosine. meta-Tyramine can be metabolized into dopamine via peripheral or brain CYP2D6 enzymes in humans.

See also 
 para-Tyramine
 3-Methoxytyramine

References 

Phenethylamines
Phenols
TAAR1 agonists
Trace amines
Norepinephrine-dopamine releasing agents